EquiLend is a securities lending platform started in late 2001 by a consortium of leading financial services institutions. Founding members include Barclays Global Investors, Bear Stearns, Goldman Sachs, JPMorganChase, Lehman Brothers, Merrill Lynch, Morgan Stanley, Northern Trust, State Street, and UBS Warburg. Its first CEO was Ian M. Drachman. The firm is now led by Brian P. Lamb.

Since launching its first platform in 2001, EquiLend has grown to service over 80 clients and has recently begun to service fixed income securities markets.

EquiLend and its prime broker owners are currently being sued in the Southern District of New York for antitrust violations. The case survived motion to dismiss in 2018.

See also
 Securities lending

References

Internet properties established in 2001